Marina Pettersson-Engström (born 21 September 1987) is a Swedish footballer. She played as a centre back for Damallsvenskan club KIF Örebro DFF and the Sweden women's national football team. After eleven seasons playing for KIF Örebro, she retired shortly after the conclusion of the 2015 season. Following the birth of her child she agreed a return to Örebro ahead of the 2017 season.

International career 

Pettersson-Engström made her debut for the senior Sweden team in a 2–1 loss to Canada on 22 November 2011. She had been drafted into the squad as a replacement for the injured Caroline Seger.

References

External links 
 
 National team profile  at SvFF
 
 
 

Living people
1987 births
Swedish women's footballers
Sweden women's international footballers
Damallsvenskan players
KIF Örebro DFF players
Sportspeople from Örebro
Women's association football defenders